Imperial Dreams is an American drama film written and directed by Malik Vitthal. The film had its world premiere at 2014 Sundance Film Festival on January 20, 2014. It won the Audience Award at the festival. The film was released as a Netflix original film on February 3, 2017.

Plot
A 21-year-old reformed gangster Bambi's devotion to his family, particularly his son Daytone, and his family's future are put to the test when he is released from prison and returns to his violent old stomping grounds in Watts, Los Angeles. Themes include mass incarceration, the importance of education, and the many obstacles present in the system that prevent those interested in rehabilitation from surviving when placed back in society.

Cast
 John Boyega as Bambi
 Rotimi Akinosho as Wayne
 Keke Palmer as Samaara
 Glenn Plummer as Uncle Shrimp
 Kellita Smith as Tanya
 De'Aundre Bonds as Gideon
 Sufe Bradshaw as Detective Gill
 Jernard Burks as Cornell
 Nora Zehetner as Janine 
 Anika Noni Rose as Miss Price
 Maximiliano Hernández as Detective Hernandez
 Ethan and Justin Coach as Daytone

Production
The title Imperial Dreams references a point in the movie where the nature of emperors of the projects is expounded upon. It's also a reference to the housing projects where the movie takes place, Imperial Courts, in Watts.

Reception

Imperial Dreams received positive reviews from critics. Review aggregator Rotten Tomatoes reports that 91% of 11 film critics have given the film a positive review, with an average rating of 7.3 out of 10.

Geoffrey Berkshire of Variety, in his review called the film "Bighearted yet surprisingly nuanced." Justin Lowe by his review for The Hollywood Reporter praised the film in calling it "An assured debut that stands to connect with a diverse audience." Chase Whale of Indiewire graded the film B+ by saying that "John Boyega first wowed audiences with his dynamite performance in Attack the Block. Once again playing the anti-hero, Imperial Dreams is another victory lap for this young actor, who's going to go on to do big, big things."

See also 
 List of hood films

References

External links
 

2014 films
American drama films
Sundance Film Festival award winners
Films produced by Andrea Sperling
Films produced by Jonathan Schwartz
English-language Netflix original films
Hood films
2014 drama films
2010s English-language films
2010s American films